The Alfa Romeo GTV and the Alfa Romeo Spider (Type 916) were sports cars produced by the Italian manufacturer Alfa Romeo from 1993 to 2004. The GTV is a 2+2 coupé, and the Spider is a two-seater roadster version of the GTV. Around 39,000 Spiders and 41,700 GTVs were built.

The GTV's name (Gran Turismo Veloce—) placed it as the successor to the long-discontinued Alfetta GTV coupé, whereas the Spider was effectively the replacement for the then 30-year-old 105-series Giulia Spider. The GTV was available until the launch of the Brera in 2005, while the Spider lasted another year until the launch of its Brera-based successor in 2006.

The Alfa Romeo GTV was described as "one of the best sports cars of its time" by Jeremy Clarkson in 1998 and was listed at number 29 in Top 100 Cars in 2001.

Design

Both cars were designed by Enrico Fumia at Pininfarina. The GTV was planned to re-establish Alfa Romeo's sporty coupe tradition for the 1990s. The design dates back to initial renderings in September 1987; the first 1:1 scale clay models were completed  in July 1988. After Vittorio Ghidella (Fiat CEO) accepted the design, Centro Stile Alfa Romeo under Walter de Silva was responsible for the completion of the detail work and the design of the interiors, as Pininfarina's proposal was not accepted. The Spider and GTV were based on the then current Fiat Group compact car platform, called "Tipo Due" (or Type 2) - in this case a heavily modified version with an all new multilink rear suspension. The front suspension and drivetrain was based on the 1992 Alfa Romeo 155 saloon. The chief engineer at that time was Bruno Cena. The Drag coefficient was 0.33 for the GTV and 0.38 for the Spider.

The Alfa Romeo grille with dual round headlights was a motif later used on the Alfa Romeo Proteo. The car is wedge-shaped with a low nose. The back of the car is "cut-off" with a "Kamm tail" giving improved aerodynamics. The Spider shares these traits with the GTV except that the rear is rounded. The Spider featured a folding soft-top with five hoop frame, which disappears from sight under a flush fitting cover. An electric folding mechanism was an option.

Details included a rear lamp/fog lamp/indicator strip across the rear of the body and minor instruments in the centre console being angled towards the driver. At its launch, many journalists commented that Alfa had improved overall build quality considerably and that it came very close to equaling its German rivals.

Awards

 1995: Autocar Magazine: "1995 Car of the Year".
 1995: Car Magazine: "Best Designed Car".
 1995: Car Magazine: Best Design Detail in production.
 1995: "The World's most Beautiful Automobile" award.
 1995: Bild: "Goldenes Lenkrad".
 1995: Automobilia: "Auto più bella del mondo".
 1995: Autocar Magazine: "Best Sport Car".
 1995: Auto Zeitung: "Best car to drive".
 1995: "Engineer of the Year" for chief Alfa Romeo engineer, Bruno Cena.
 1995: Trofeu do Automovel Categoria "Deportivo di Ano" (Sports Car of the Year)

History

The GTV was initially offered with 2.0 TS or 2.0 V6 Turbo, while Spider with 2.0 TS or 3.0 V6 12V.

The exterior design was finished in July 1988. Production began in late 1993 with four cars, all 3.0 V6 Spiders, assembled at the Alfa Romeo Arese Plant in Milan. In early 1994 the first GTV was produced, with 2.0 Twin Spark engine. The first premiere was then held at the Paris Motor Show in 1994. The GTV and Spider were officially launched at the Geneva Motor Show in March 1995 and sales began the same year. V6 Turbo GTVs had two air intakes on the lower lip, one for oil cooler and other for intercooler. Early V6 Spiders lacked any additional intakes as the oil cooler was mounted in front of the radiator. The car was produced in three distinct phases. The Phase 1 cars had a black plastic grille in the nose of the bonnet, without the chrome edging and black-painted sills all round.

1997 changes
In 1997 (Phase 1b) a new engine, a 24-valve 3.0 litre V6, was available for the GTV, The new 24V car also came equipped with a new 16" 5 hole 'teledial' wheel design to provide extra clearance for the larger, brakes and red four-pot calipers from Brembo. Further exterior changes were new rear badging 'V6 24V' denoting the fitment of the new engine, and V6 Turbo-sourced front bumper lip with just one intake on the right hand side to allow air flow to front mounted oil cooler. Some versions were upgraded with different front bumper mesh to bring the wind noise down to 74 dBA.

On the interior, pleated leather seats from MOMO were offered in White, Red or Tan. These seats came with respective matching coloured carpet, pleated leather door card inserts as well as optional colour coded stitching around, hand brake, gear lever and the stitching of an all new three-spoke steering wheel. First RHD cars from this generation retained the original, four-spoke, steering wheel.

1998 facelift
In May 1998 the cars were revamped for the first time (Phase 2), mainly the interior was changed with new center console, painted letters on skirt seals, changed controls and switches arrangement and different instrument cluster. On the exterior main changes included chrome frame around the grille and color-coded side skirts and bumpers. A new engine was introduced, the  1.8 Twin Spark, and others were changed: the 2.0 Twin Spark was updated with a modular intake manifold with different length intakes and a different plastic cover. Engines changed engine management units and have a nomenclature of CF2. The dashboard was available in two new colours in addition to the standard black: Red Style and Blue Style, and with it new colour-coded upholstery and carpets. 3.0 24V got a six-speed manual gearbox as an optional extra. The 2.0 V6 TB engine was now also available for the Spider. From this generation every V6-engined car had additional air intakes on the lower lip.

2000 engine revamp
In August 2000 (Phase 2b), engines were revamped to comply with new Euro3 emission standards. The units were slightly detuned and have a new identification code "CF3". The 3.0 V6 12V was discontinued for the Spider and replaced with the 24V version from the GTV, now only with 6-speed manual gearbox. The 2.0 V6 Turbo and 1.8 T.Spark were discontinued also and, for MY 2001, the engine range comprised only the 2.0 T.Spark and 3.0 V6 24V, until the "Phase 3" engine range arrived. The GTV/Spider were the last Alfa Romeo cars made at the Arese plant, which closed with production moving to Pininfarina, at its Giorgio Canavese plant in Turin, in October 2000.

2003 facelift
In 2003 a new and last revamp arrived (Phase 3), also designed in Pininfarina but not by Enrico Fumia. Main changes are focused on the front with new 147-style grille and different front bumpers with offset numberplate holder. Change in interior was minimal with different center console and upholstery pattern and colours available. Instrument illumination colour was changed from green to red. Main specification change is an ASR traction control, not available for 2.0 TS Base model. New engines were introduced:  2.0 JTS with direct petrol injection and  3.2 V6 24V allowing  top speed.

By the end of 2004 production ended at Pininfarina's plant. Some cars were still available for purchase until 2006.

Characteristics

Engines
The engine range included of the GTV and Spider included the in-line 4-cylinder:
 1.8-litre 16-valve
 2.0-litre 16-valve Twin Spark
as well as the V6:
 2.0-litre 12-valve turbo
 3.0-litre 12-valve
 3.0-litre 24-valve
 3.2-litre 24-valve.

The turbocharged 2.0-litre V6, called V6 TB, was developed because of Italy's fiscal policy imposing a higher sales taxes on cars powered by engines with a capacity of more than 2.0-litre. It is basically a sleeved-down version of the 3.0-litre V6 engine. The turbo provided extra power while avoiding the higher tax. Both the 12-valve V6 engines have a redline of about 6,500 rpm, while 16 and 24-valve engines have 7,000 rpm.

The 2.0-litre 16-valve Twin Spark engine of the 2.0 TS model was based on the Fiat SuperFIRE-family block, featuring an Alfa Romeo-developed cylinder head with two spark plugs per cylinder. Variable inlet cam timing, which allowed for 25 degrees of variation, was designed to improve torque and give a more linear power delivery. In addition, this engine has two belt driven balance shafts rotating at twice the engine speed, to eliminate engine vibrations. The base 1.8-litre engine did not feature balance shafts. The TS was the best-selling version of the GTV and Spider. CF2 and CF3 engines have plastic valve cover and variable-length intake manifold.

The JTS engine uses only one spark plug per cylinder but retained variable-length inlet manifold and variable valve timing on intake camshaft.

Specifications

*performance values for GTV, unless otherwise stated
**top speed with aerokit + for all, + for 3.0 V6 24V

Fuel economy

*factory data

Equipment
The GTV/Spider was equipped as standard with power steering, driver and passenger airbag, automatic air conditioning, front seatbelt pretensioners, Bosch ABS (with EBD from 1998), electric heated door mirrors, electric frameless windows with one-touch operation for the driver's side, height adjustable headlamps, front and rear foglights, third brake light, fire prevention system, reach and rake adjustable leather clad steering wheel, stitched leather gear knob, an automatic electric aerial, a stereo radio/cassette with six speakers and central locking with Alfa-CODE immobiliser, internal electric release for the bootlid and filler flap. The additional options were: alarm system, passenger-side airbag installation/removal, electric heated seats (GTV only), metallic paint, iridescent paint (only with Lusso trim), leather MOMO seats (only with Lusso trim) and electric sunroof (GTV only). For the Spider some cars could be equipped with an electric hood folding mechanism.

The Lusso was a separate trim rather than an option pack and the standard car was renamed the "Turismo" from "Medio" in the UK. Medio and Lusso trims on phase 1 and 2 cars were available with almost any engine, except for Medio-only 1.8 L TS. Phase 3 cars were divided into Medio-only 2.0 L JTS and Lusso-only 3.2 L V6, also available was "Base" M.Y. 2003 2.0 L TS.

Blue Style and Red Style interiors were available with Lusso trim on Phase 2 and on all Phase 3 cars. Blue Style consisted of blue dashboard and white or blue leather MOMO seats, while Red Style had red dashboard with red or black leather MOMO seats. Rest of the equipment and options remain unchanged. With standard black dashboard there were 4 leather MOMO seat colours to choose from (excluding limited editions): black, red and tan. Also light-grey but only for Spider. On Phase 1 cars the leather MOMO seats were available in 3 colours: red, tan and white.

Technical
All CF3 versions have three catalytic converters installed, two of them at the exhaust manifold. Previous CF1 and CF2 engines had only one catalytic converter.

The battery is located in the boot of the GTV or in the storage compartment behind the seats of the Spider. The optional CD auto changer is located in the boot, and the fuel tank is ahead of the rear axle line, behind the rear seats for increased safety. The power assisted steering has a very high ratio, giving 2.2 turns lock-to-lock. The bonnet and bootlid are supported on nitrogen filled struts. A spacesaver spare wheel was supplied, and there was a no-cost option of an aerosol can of tyre repair sealant.

To save weight the bonnet was made from a composite material called KMC (composed of polyester and fiberglass, and using epoxi adhesives also), while front wings were made in PUR plastic. At the time, the bonnet was the largest single composite moulding on a production car. When the bonnet is opened, two rectangular Hella headlamps are revealed with separate bulbs for dip and main beam, behind the four round holes in the bonnet. The bodyshell was galvanised with full plastic wheelarch liners and is therefore rustproof. Weight distribution for four cylinder engined car is 61% front/39% rear and for a V6 is 63% front/37% rear

As would be expected, the GTV has a much more rigid chassis, up to 64% stiffer, although considerable work was done on the Spider to reduce the traditional convertible problem of scuttle shake. Spider also features a reinforced A-pillars.

Wheels are 15 inch perforated steel as standard, 16 inch teardrop alloy wheels with 205/50 tyres were part of the Lusso option package. From Phase 2 and 3 16 inch teardrop alloy wheels became standard with factory option of 17 inch alloy wheels and 225/45 tyres. Only from Phase 3 (not including earlier limited editions) did Spider receive 17 inch wheels option.

Criticisms of the model have been that it is hard to park due to its large turning circle (11,2 m on most cars) and low seating position, which mean that the end of the bonnet and corners are outside the driver's line of sight. The doors are very long and need plenty of space in a car park.

*from: sales brochures, owners manuals and repair manuals

Suspension
The front suspension utilises a fairly conventional set-up that comprises MacPherson struts, offset coil springs, lower wishbones and an anti-roll bar.

The independent, multiple arm rear suspension comprises quadrilateral geometry with an upper triangle, double lower arms, coil springs and anti-roll bar secured to a light alloy subframe which is, in turn, mounted onto the car's body. The design of this geometry, and the fine tuning of the bushes, is such that during initial stages of a turn, the centrifugal forces create a small 'rear wheel steer' effect in the opposite direction to the way the front wheels are being pointed. Then, as the centrifugal forces build up through the corner, the rear wheels start steering in the same direction as the front wheels. The result is a more positive 'attack' into the first stages of cornering and increased stability in the later stages. This multilink rear suspension was designed by Gianclaudio Travaglio.

Brakes
Cars have disc brakes all round, while most versions had  Lucas or ATE system ventilated-discs at the front, some Spiders (1.8 TS and 2.0 TS) had  Altecna-system. 3.0 V6 24V GTV and Spider had  Brembo-system ventilated-discs with 4-pot calipers painted red with white 'Alfa Romeo" lettering.  3.2 V6 cars had the same 305 mm discs, even though GTA cars were later upgraded to 330 mm. All cars had  Lucas-system solid-discs at the back.

*stated by Pininfarina production records
**stated by Robert Foskett: Alfa Romeo 916 GTV and Spider: The Complete Story

Limited editions

There were numerous limited edition GTV and Spider available. All can be categorized into 4 groups: Edizione Sportiva GTV 2001, Special Series 2001, Limited Editions 2002 and Special Series 2004.  Almost all have the titanium-like finished center console without the Alfa Romeo script. All Special Series (except for some German-market Edizione Classica) cars have a silver numbered plaque on the side of the center console. All of the cars except for the first have unique version codes. All Spiders have electrically operated hood. All cars are in Lusso-trim equipment. Total numbers for each limited edition vary from as little as 8 or 10 to 419 or 700. Apart from producer sanctioned editions there were also few importer exclusive editions made for particular markets like Australia or Japan.

GTV Cup 2001
The GTV Cup is a limited edition inspired by the mono-make Alfa GTV Cup race series in Italy. Only 419 cars were built in total, with 264 LHD versions and 155 RHD versions. Two different engines were used in the production: 180 cars were built with the 3.0 V6 24V (all 155 RHD versions were 3.0 models) and 239 cars with 2.0 Twin Sparks. The 3.0 V6 cars were only painted in Alfa Romeo Red while 2.0 TS cars were almost exclusively painted in Grigio Chiaro (there are just a few examples in red). Limited edition plaques, that were made of silver, differed for the RHD and LHD versions, having red and black texts accordingly and each run was separately numbered (i.e. there is both a LHD 001 and a RHD 001). Differences between the standard GTV and the Cup version are factory fitted rear spoiler, front spoiler, side skirts, wheel arch side vents and titanium-like finish 17-inch 'telephone dial' alloys;, although mechanically they are the same as the regular specifications. The Cup exclusive interior offers half-leather upholstery and the plastic centre console fascias were finished in a darker shade of grey. 2.0 TS GTV Cups have 4-pot Brembo callipers as have 3.0 V6 GTVs.

Edizione Sportiva GTV 2001
German-market GTV available as a limited edition "Edizione Sportiva". Cars were only available with 2.0 TS or 3.0 V6 24V CF3 engines and produced in 2001.
GTV Edizione Sportiva differed from the standard car by having black leather upholstery with red stitching, red carpets, front wings from Zender, Blaupunkt radio/navi with 10-CD changer in the boot, electric seats, 17-inch 'teledial' alloys and was available only in Nero Met. Edizione Sportiva was limited to 500 cars, but around 200 were made. This is the only limited edition to have the Alfa Romeo script on the center console and the only edition to lack the unique version code.

GTV Serie Speciale 'Elegant' 2001
GTV 'Elegant' was available in Blu Vela Met. or Nero Met. and had brown leather upholstery, darker than the standard tanned leather; and black carpets. Also there were additional leather strips underneath the door armrest, as have most limited editions. It also has a "Serie Limitata" numbered plaque on the titanium-like finished center console. Available with CF3 engines: 2.0 TS and 3.0 V6 24V.

Edizione Classica Spider 2001
Spider only, 2001 limited edition with either a 2.0 TS or 3.0 V6 24V engine. Sold only in Nero Met. with 17-inch high-gloss 'teledial' alloys and electric hood. Center console with limited edition numbered plaque and without the "Alfa Romeo" script. The interior is light grey upholstery combined with black carpets, although German-market cars appear as regular cars with light grey carpets and regular center console.

Spider Serie Speciale 'Elegant' 2001
Spider, available in Giallo Ginestra or Grigio Chiaro Met. with Blue Style dashboard and matching blue leather Momo seats and carpets. Blue electric hood, high-gloss finished 'teledial' alloys and limited edition numbered plaque on the center console. Only 600 cars offered with 2.0 TS or 3.0 V6 24V but around 300 were made.

Motus GTV 2002
GTV only, Nero Met. exterior with two-part Zender kit, perforated black upholstery interior with red leather Momo seats, titanium-like finished center console without limited edition plaque, 17-inch alloys. Other combination features Rosso Miro Pearl. exterior and perforated black leather interior. Available with 2.0 TS and Nero Met. also with 3.0 V6 24V.

Lux GTV 2002
Two different GTV editions. Grigio Chiaro Met. exterior and 'tango' leather interior with black carpets. Azzurro Nuvola Pearl. exterior and Black Leather interior. 2.0 TS only.

Edizione Sportiva Spider 2002
Spider Edizione Sportiva was equipped with side skirts and front wings from Zender, available only in Grigio Chiaro Met. with perforated black leather upholstery with red stitching. All limited-edition Spiders had titanium-like finished center consoles, without the "Alfa Romeo" sign and unlike serie speciales didn't have a limited edition plaque. All were offered with 17-inch alloys and electrically folded hood.

Edizione Elegante Spider 2002
Spider Edizione Elegante was available only in Nero Met. and had two-tone leather seats, either black-light grey or black-red with matching side panels upholstery, equipped with 2.0 TS or 3.0 V6 24V.

Lux Spider 2002
Two different Spider editions. Blue Lightning Met. exterior and 'tango' brown leather interior with blue electric hood. Grigio Chiaro Met. exterior and Black-Lys Grey Leather interior with black hood. 2.0 TS only with Blue Lightning Met. available also with 3.0 V6 24V.

Spider Sport Limited Edition 2002
Spider available only in Nero Met. and Motus-like interior with black carpets, black upholstery and perforated red leather seats, equipped with 2.0 TS or 3.0 V6 24V.

Spider Elegant Limited Edition 2002
Spider available only in Grigio Chiaro Met. with two-tone interior: black-tango leather, equipped with 2.0 TS or 3.0 V6 24V.

Spider Elegant Limited Edition 2002
Spider available only in Blu Lightning Met. and Lys Grey Leather interior, equipped only with 3.0 V6 24V.

Edizione Nero Spider 2004
Phase 3 Spider only, available from March 2004, limited to 30 cars in Austria with total 150 cars. Black metallic with black/silver cloth interior 2.0 JTS engine.

Spider Edizione 2004
Phase 3 Spider only, available in Rosso Miro Pearl. or Blu Reims Met. only with 2.0 JTS engine. Interior either Red or Blue Cloth or Black Leather. Limited to 350 cars total. Limited to Medio trim.

Motorsport

Alfa GTV Cup

Prototypes

Vivace
Alfa Romeo Vivace
Twin cars, coupé and spider, made as a preview of upcoming 916-series. Styled in 1986 by Diego Ottina at Pininfarina with cues from then-ready Alfa Romeo 164.

Proteo

Alfa 164-based concept from 1991, designed by Walter de Silva with styling cues from then-ready GTV/Spider design.

Vola

Concept car styled by Leonardo Fioravanti in 2000, based on Spider chassis with 3.0 V6 12V engine.

Spider Monoposto

References

External links

 916 owners forum
 Alfa Romeo GTV & Spider Community Forum
 Alfa Romeo Club for dedicated owners 

2000s cars
GTV Spider
Coupés
Front-wheel-drive sports cars
Pininfarina
Roadsters
Cars introduced in 1995

it:Alfa Romeo Spider (1995)